Object relations theory is a school of thought in psychoanalytic theory centered around theories of stages of ego development. Its concerns include the relation of the psyche to others in childhood and the exploration of relationships between external people, as well as internal images and the relations found in them. Thinkers of the school maintain that the infant's relationship with the mother primarily determines the formation of its personality in adult life. Particularly, attachment is the bedrock of the development of the self or the psychic organization that creates the sense of identity.

Theory 
While its groundwork derives from theories of development of the ego in Freudian psychodynamics, object relations theory does not place emphasis on the role of biological drives in the formation of personality in adulthood. Thinkers of the school instead suggest that the way people relate to others and situations in their adult lives is shaped by family experiences during infancy; an adult who experienced neglect or abuse in infancy expects similar behavior from others who, through transference, remind them of the neglectful or abusive parent from their past. These patterns of the behavior of people become repeated images of the events, and eventually turn into objects in the unconscious that the self carries into adulthood to be used in the unconscious to predict people's behavior in their social relationships and interactions.

The first "object" in an individual is usually an internalized image of the mother. Internal objects are formed by the patterns in one's experience of being taken care of as a baby, which may or may not be accurate representations of the actual, external caretakers. Objects are usually internalized images of one's mother, father, or primary caregiver, although they could also consist of parts of a person such as an infant relating to the breast or things in one's inner world (one's internalized image of others).
Later experiences can reshape these early patterns, but objects often continue to exert a strong influence throughout life. Objects are initially comprehended in the infant mind by their functions and are termed part objects. The breast that feeds the hungry infant is the "good breast", while a hungry infant that finds no breast is in relation to the "bad breast". With a "good enough" facilitating environment, part object functions eventually transform into a comprehension of whole objects. This corresponds with the ability to tolerate ambiguity, to see that both the "good" and the "bad" breast are a part of the same mother figure.

History
The initial line of thought emerged in 1917 with Sándor Ferenczi and, early in the 1930s, Harry Stack Sullivan, coiner of the term "interpersonal". British psychologists Melanie Klein, Donald Winnicott, Harry Guntrip, Scott Stuart, and others extended object relations theory during the 1940s and 1950s; in 1952, Ronald Fairbairn independently formulated his theory of object relations.

The term has been used in many different contexts, which led to different connotations and denotations. While Fairbairn popularized the term "object relations", Melanie Klein's work tends to be most commonly identified with the terms "object relations theory" and "British object relations", at least in contemporary North America, though the influence of the British Independent Group—which argued that the primary motivation of the child is object seeking rather than drive gratification—is becoming increasingly recognized. Klein felt that the psychodynamic battleground that Freud proposed occurs very early in life, during infancy. Furthermore, its origins are different from those that Freud proposed. The interactions between infant and mother are so deep and intense that they form the focus of the infant's structure of drives. Some of these interactions provoke anger and frustration; others provoke strong emotions of dependence as the child begins to recognize the mother is more than a breast from which to feed. These reactions threaten to overwhelm the individuality of the infant. The way in which the infant resolves the conflict, Klein believed, is reflected in the adult's personality.

Freud originally identified people in a subject's environment with the term "object" to identify people as the object of drives. Fairbairn took a radical departure from Freud by positing that humans were not seeking satisfaction of the drive, but actually seek the satisfaction that comes in being in relation to real others. Klein and Fairbairn were working along similar lines, but unlike Fairbairn, Klein always held that she was not departing from Freudian theory, but simply elaborating early developmental phenomena consistent with Freudian theory.

Within the London psychoanalytic community, a conflict of loyalties took place between Klein and object relations theory (sometimes referred to as "id psychology"),
and Anna Freud and ego psychology. In America, Anna Freud heavily influenced American psychoanalysis in the 1940s, 1950s, and 1960s. American ego psychology was furthered in the works of Hartmann, Kris, Loewenstein, Rapaport, Erikson, Jacobson, and Mahler. In London, those who refused to choose sides were termed the "middle school," whose members included Michael Balint and D.W. Winnicott. A certain division developed in England between the school of Anna Freud and that of Melanie Klein, which later influenced psychoanalytic politics worldwide. Klein was popularized in South America while A. Freud garnered an American allegiance.

Fairbairn's theory of attachment
Fairbairn identified how people who were abused as children internalize that experience; the "moral defense" is the tendency seen in survivors of abuse to take all the bad upon themselves, each yielding the moral evil so the caretaker-object can be regarded as good. This is a use of splitting as a defense to maintain an attachment relationship in an unsafe world. In one particular example of this circumstance, Fairbairn introduced a four-year-old girl who had suffered a broken arm from her mother to a doctor friend of his, who told the little girl that they were going to find her a new parent. The girl, now panicked and unhappy, replied that she wanted her "real mommy", before Fairbairn asked "You mean the mommy that broke your arm?" "I was bad," the girl replied; from this exchange, he theorized that she needed to believe that her love object (mother) was entirely good to firmly believe she would one day receive the love and nurturing she needed—in an attempt to recuperate these needs, she used the moral defense to make herself bad in order to preserve her mother's goodness.

Kleinian object relations theory

Unconscious phantasy 
Klein termed the psychological aspect of instinct unconscious phantasy (deliberately spelled with 'ph' to distinguish it from the word 'fantasy'). Phantasy is a given of psychic life which moves outward towards the world. These image-potentials are given a priority with the drives and eventually allow the development of more complex states of mental life. Unconscious phantasy in the infant's emerging mental life is modified by the environment as the infant has contact with reality.

From the moment the infant starts interacting with the outer world, he is engaged in testing his phantasies in a reality setting. I want to suggest that the origin of thought lies in this process of testing phantasy against reality; that is, that thought is not only contrasted with phantasy, but based on it and derived from it.

The role of unconscious phantasy is essential in the development of a capacity for thinking. In Bion's terms, the phantasy image is a preconception that will not be a thought until experience combines with a realization in the world of experience. The preconception and realization combine to take form as a concept that can be thought. The classic example of this is the infant's observed rooting for the nipple in the first hours of life. The instinctual rooting is the preconception. The provision of the nipple provides the realization in the world of experience, and through time, with repeated experience, the preconception and realization combined to create the concept. Mental capacity builds upon previous experience as the environment and infant interact.
The first bodily experiences begin to build up the first memories, and external realities are progressively woven into the texture of phantasy. Before long, the child's phantasies are able to draw upon plastic images as well as sensations—visual, auditory, kinæsthetic, touch, taste, smell images, etc. And these plastic images and dramatic representations of phantasy are progressively elaborated along with articulated perceptions of the external world.
With adequate care, the infant is able to tolerate increasing awareness of experience which is underlain by unconscious phantasy and leads to attainment of consecutive developmental achievements, "the positions" in Kleinian theory.

Projective identification
As a specific term, projective identification is introduced by Klein in “Notes on some schizoid mechanisms.”
[Projection] helps the ego to overcome anxiety by ridding it of danger and badness. Introjection of the good object is also used by the ego as a defense against anxiety. . . .The processes of splitting off parts of the self and projecting them into objects are thus of vital importance for normal development as well as for abnormal object-relation. The effect of introjection on object relations is equally important. The introjection of the good object, first of all the mother’s breast, is a precondition for normal development . . . It comes to form a focal point in the ego and makes for cohesiveness of the ego. . . . I suggest for these processes the term ‘projective identification’.
Klein imagined this function as a defense which contributes to the normal development of the infant, including ego structure and the development of object relations. The introjection of the good breast provides a location where one can hide from persecution, an early step in developing a capacity to self-soothe.

Ogden identifies four functions that projective identification may serve. As in the traditional Kleinian model, it serves as a defense. Projective identification serves as a mode of communication. It is a form of object relations, and “a pathway for psychological change.” As a form of object relationship, projective identification is a way of relating with others who are not seen as entirely separate from the individual. Instead, this relating takes place “between the stage of the subjective object and that of true object relatedness”.

The paranoid-schizoid and depressive positions

The positions of Kleinian theory, underlain by unconscious phantasy, are stages in the normal development of ego and object relationships, each with its own characteristic defenses and organizational structure.  The paranoid-schizoid and depressive positions occur in the pre-oedipal, oral phase of development.

In contrast to Fairbairn and later Guntrip,  Klein believed that both good and bad objects are introjected by the infant, the internalization of good objects being essential to the development of healthy ego function. Klein conceptualized the depressive position as “the most mature form of psychological organization”, which continues to develop throughout the life span.

The depressive position occurs during the second quarter of the first year. Prior to that the infant is in the paranoid-schizoid position, which is characterized by persecutory anxieties and the mechanisms of splitting, projection, introjection, and omnipotence—which includes idealizing and denial—to defend against these anxieties. Depressive and paranoid-schizoid modes of experience continue to intermingle throughout the first few years of childhood.

Paranoid-schizoid position
The paranoid-schizoid position is characterized by part object relationships. Part objects are a function of splitting, which takes place in phantasy. At this developmental stage, experience can only be perceived as all good or all bad. As part objects, it is the function that is identified by the experiencing self, rather than whole and autonomous others. The hungry infant desires the good breast who feeds it. Should that breast appear, it is the good breast. If the breast does not appear, the hungry and now frustrated infant, in its distress, has destructive phantasies dominated by oral aggression towards the bad, hallucinated breast.

Klein notes that in splitting the object, the ego is also split. The infant who phantasies destruction of the bad breast is not the same infant that takes in the good breast, at least not until obtaining the depressive position, at which point good and bad can be tolerated simultaneously in the same person and the capacity for remorse and reparation ensue.

The anxieties of the paranoid schizoid position are of a persecutory nature, fear of the ego's annihilation. Splitting allows good to stay separate from bad. Projection is an attempt to eject the bad in order to control through omnipotent mastery. Splitting is never fully effective, according to Klein, as the ego tends towards integration.

Depressive position
Klein saw the depressive position as an important developmental milestone that continues to mature throughout the life span. The splitting and part object relations that characterize the earlier phase are succeeded by the capacity to perceive that the other who frustrates is also the one who gratifies. Schizoid defenses are still in evidence, but feelings of guilt, grief, and the desire for reparation gain dominance in the developing mind.

In the depressive position, the infant is able to experience others as whole, which radically alters object relationships from the earlier phase. “Before the depressive position, a good object is not in any way the same thing as a bad object. It is only in the depressive position that polar qualities can be seen as different aspects of the same object.” Increasing nearness of good and bad brings a corresponding integration of ego.

In a development which Grotstein terms the "primal split", the infant becomes aware of separateness from the mother.  This awareness allows guilt to arise in response to the infant's previous aggressive phantasies when bad was split from good. The mother's temporary absences allow for continuous restoration of her “as an image of representation” in the infant mind. Symbolic thought may now arise, and can only emerge once access to the depressive position has been obtained. With the awareness of the primal split, a space is created in which the symbol, the symbolized, and the experiencing subject coexist. History, subjectivity, interiority, and empathy all become possible.

The anxieties characteristic of the depressive position shift from a fear of being destroyed to a fear of destroying others. In fact or phantasy, one now realizes the capacity to harm or drive away a person who one ambivalently loves. The defenses characteristic of the depressive position include the manic defenses, repression and reparation. The manic defenses are the same defenses evidenced in the paranoid-schizoid position, but now mobilized to protect the mind from depressive anxiety. As the depressive position brings about an increasing integration in the ego, earlier defenses change in character, becoming less intense and allowing for an increased awareness of psychic reality.

In working through depressive anxiety, projections are withdrawn, allowing the other more autonomy, reality, and a separate existence. The infant, whose destructive phantasies were directed towards the bad mother who frustrated, now begins to realize that bad and good, frustrating and satiating, it is always the same mother. Unconscious guilt for destructive phantasies arises in response to the continuing love and attention provided by caretakers.
[As] fears of losing the loved one become active, a very important step is made in the development. These feelings of guilt and distress now enter as a new element into the emotion of love. They become an inherent part of love, and influence it profoundly both in quality and quantity.
From this developmental milestone come a capacity for sympathy, responsibility to and concern for others, and an ability to identify with the subjective experience of people one cares about. With the withdrawal of the destructive projections, repression of the aggressive impulses takes place. The child allows caretakers a more separate existence, which facilitates increasing differentiation of inner and outer reality. Omnipotence is lessened, which corresponds to a decrease in guilt and the fear of loss.

When all goes well, the developing child is able to comprehend that external others are autonomous people with their own needs and subjectivity.

Previously, extended absences of the object (the good breast, the mother) was experienced as persecutory, and, according to the theory of unconscious phantasy, the persecuted infant phantisizes destruction of the bad object. The good object who then arrives is not the object which did not arrive. Likewise, the infant who destroyed the bad object is not the infant who loves the good object.

In phantasy, the good internal mother can be psychically destroyed by the aggressive impulses. It is crucial that the real parental figures are around to demonstrate the continuity of their love. In this way, the child perceives that what happens to good objects in phantasy does not happen to them in reality. Psychic reality is allowed to evolve as a place separate from the literalness of the physical world.

Through repeated experience with good enough parenting, the internal image that the child has of external others, that is the child's internal object, is modified by experience and the image transforms, merging experiences of good and bad which becomes more similar to the real object (e.g. the mother, who can be both good and bad). In Freudian terms, the pleasure principle is modified by the reality principle.

Melanie Klein saw this surfacing from the depressive position as a prerequisite for social life. Moreover, she viewed the establishment of an inside and an outside world as the start of interpersonal relationships.

Klein argued that people who never succeed in working through the depressive position in their childhood will, as a result, continue to struggle with this problem in adult life. For example: the cause that a person may maintain suffering from intense guilt feelings over the death of a loved one, may be found in the unworked- through depressive position. The guilt is there because of a lack of differentiation between phantasy and reality. It also functions as a defense mechanism to defend the self against unbearable feelings of sadness and sorrow, and the internal object of the loved one against the unbearable rage of the self, which, it is feared, could destroy the internal object forever.

Further thinking regarding the positions
Wilfred Bion articulates the dynamic nature of the positions, a point emphasised by Thomas Ogden, and expanded by John Steiner in terms of '"The equilibrium between the paranoid-schizoid and the depressive positions"'. Ogden and James Grotstein have continued to explore early infantile states of mind, and incorporating the work of Donald Meltzer, Esther Bick and others, postulate a position preceding the paranoid-schizoid.  Grotstein, following Bion, also hypothesizes a transcendent position which emerges following attainment of the depressive position. This aspect of both Ogden and Grotstein's work remains controversial for many within classical object relations theory.

Death drive
Sigmund Freud developed the concept object relation to describe or emphasize that bodily drives satisfy their need through a medium, an object, on a specific focus. The central thesis in Melanie Klein's object relations theory was that objects play a decisive role in the development of a subject and can be either part-objects or whole-objects, i.e. a single organ (a mother's breast) or a whole person (a mother). Consequently, both a mother or just the mother's breast can be the focus of satisfaction for a drive. Furthermore, according to traditional psychoanalysis, there are at least two types of drives, the libido (mythical counterpart: Eros), and the death drive, mortido (mythical counterpart: Thanatos). Thus, the objects can be receivers of both love and hate, the affective effects of the libido and the death drive.

Ronald Fairbairn's model of object relations theory

Fairbairn was impressed with the work of Klein, particularly in her emphasis on internalized objects,  but he objected to the notion that internalization of external objects was based on  death instinct.  The death instinct is a remnant of the Freudian model that was emphasized in Klein's model, and her model assumes that human behavior is motivated by a struggle between the instinctual forces of  love and hate.  Klein believed that each human being was born with  a inborn death instinct which motivated the child to imagine hurting their mother during the schizoid period of development. The child attempts to protect themselves from becoming overwhelmed by hate by internalizing, or taking into themselves, memories of the loving aspects of their parents to counteract the hateful components. Fairbairn's model also emphasized the internalization of external objects, but his view of internalization was not based on instinctual drive, but rather the child's normal desire to understand the world around him.

Fairbairn began his theory with his observation of the child's absolute dependency on the good will of its mother. The infant, Fairbairn noted, was dependent on its maternal object (or caretaker) for providing him with all of his physical and psychological needs as noted in the following passage.The outstanding feature of infantile dependence is its unconditional character. The infant is completely dependent upon its object not only for his existence and physical well being, but also for the satisfaction of his psychological needs...In contrast, the very helplessness of the child is sufficient to render him dependent in an unconditional sense...He has no alternative but to accept or reject his object- an alternative that is liable to present itself to him as a choice between life and death (Fairbairn, 1952, 47)

When the maternal object provides a sense of safety and warmth, the child's innate "central ego" is able to take in new experiences which allows him to expand his contact with the environment beyond the tight orbit of his mother. This is the beginning of the process of differentiation, or separation from the parent, which eventuates into a new and unique individual. As long as the maternal object continues to provide emotional warmth, support, and a sense of safety, the child will continue to develop throughout childhood. However, if the parent fails to consistently provide these factors, the child's development stops and he regresses and remains undifferentiated from his mother, as the following quote illustrates.The greatest need of a child is to obtain conclusive assurance (a) that he is genuinely loved as a person by his parents, and (b) that his parents genuinely accept his love. It is only in so far as such assurance is forthcoming in a form sufficiently convincing to enable him to depend safely upon his real objects that he is able to gradually renounce infantile dependence without misgiving. In the absence of such assurance his relationship with his objects is fraught with too much anxiety over separation  to enable him to renounce the attitude of infantile dependence: for such a renunciation would be equivalent in his eyes to forfeiting all hope of ever obtaining the satisfaction of his unsatisfied emotional needs. Frustration of his desire to be loved as a person and have his love accepted is the greatest trauma that a child can experience (Fairbairn, 1952:39-40).  This quote illustrates the basis of Fairbairn's model. It is completely interpersonal in that there are no biological drives of inherited instincts. The child is born with a need for love and safety, and when his interpersonal environment fails him, he stops developing psychologically and emotionally. The counterintitutive result of maternal (or paternal, if the father is the primary caregiver) failure is that the child becomes more, rather than less, dependent upon her, because by failing to meet her child's needs the child has to remain dependent in the hope that love and support will be forthcoming in the future. Over time, the failed support of the child's developmental needs leaves him further and further behind his similarly aged peers. The emotionally abandoned child must turn to his own resources for comfort, and turns to his inner world with its readily available fantasies, in an attempt to partially meet his needs for comfort, love and later, for success. Often these fantasies involve others figures who have been self-created. Fairbairn noted that the child's turn toward his inner world protected him from the harsh reality of his family environment, but turned him away from external reality. "All represent relationships with internalized objects, to which the individual is compelled to turn in default of satisfactory relationships in the outer world (Fairbairn, 1952, 40 italics in the original).

Fairbairn's Structural Theory 
Fairbairn realized that the child's absolute dependence on the good will of his mother made him intolerant of accepting or even acknowledging that he is being abused because that would weaken his necessary attachment to his parent. The child creates a delusion that he in a lives warm cocoon of love, and any information that interferes with this delusion is forcibly expelled from his consciousness, as he cannot face the terror of rejection or abandonment at three, four or five years of age. The defense that children use to maintain their sense of security is dissociation, and they force all memories of parental failures (neglect, indifference or emotional abandonments) into their unconscious. Over time the neglected child develops an ever expanding memory bank of event after event in which he was neglected. These dissociated interpersonal events are always in pairs, a self in relationship to an object. For example, a child who is neglected dissociates a memory of himself as a frightened confused self who has been neglected by a remote and indifferent parent. If these events are repeated again and again, the child's unconscious groups the memories into a view of the self and a view of the parent, both which are too toxic and upsetting to be allow into consciousness. The paired dissociations of self and object  that accrued from rejections were called the antilibidinal ego (the child's frightened self) and the rejecting object (the indifferent or absent parent).  Thus, in addition to the conscious central ego, which relates to the nurturing and supportive parts of the parent (called the ideal object), the child has a second view of self and object in his unconscious: the antilibidinal ego and the rejecting object.    

No child can live in a world devoid of hope for the future. Fairbairn had a part time position in an orphanage, where he saw neglected and abused children. He noticed that they created fantasies about the "goodness" of their parents and eagerly looked forward to being reunited with them. He realized that these children had dissociated and repressed  the many physical and emotional outrages that they had been subjected to in the family. Once in the orphanage, these same children lived in a fantasy world of hope and expectation, which prevented them from psychological collapse. The fantasy self that the child develops was called the libidinal self (or libidinal ego)  and it related to the very best parts of the parents, who may have shown interest or tenderness toward their child at one time or another, which the needy child then enhances with fantasy. The fantasy enhanced view of the parent was called the exciting object by Fairbairn, which was based on the excitement of the child as he spun his fantasy of a reunion with his loving parents. This pair of self and objects is also contained in the child's unconscious, but he may call them into awareness when he is desperate for comfort and support (Fairbairn, 1952, 102-119)

Fairbairn's structural model contains three selves that relate to three aspects of the object. The selves do not know or relate to each other, and the process of dissociation and the development of these structures is called the splitting defense, or splitting. 

The child's central ego relates to the  Ideal object  when the parent is supportive and nurturant. 

The antilibidinal ego relates only to the rejecting object, and these structures contain the child's fear and anger as well as the parent's indifference, neglect or outright abuse.

The libidinal ego relates only  to the exciting object, and these structures contain the  overly hopeful child who relates to the exciting over-promising  parent. 

The Fairbairnian object relations therapist imagines that all interactions between the client and the therapist are occurring in the client's inner object relations world, in one of the three dyads. The Fairbairnian object relations therapist also uses his/her own emotional reactions as therapeutic cues. If the therapist is feeling irritated at the client, or bored, he/she might interpret that as a re-enactment of the Antilibidinal Ego and the Bad Object, with the therapist cast in the role of Bad Object. If the therapist can patiently be an empathic therapist through the client's re-enactment, then the client has a new experience to incorporate into their inner object world, hopefully expanding their inner picture of their Good Object. Cure is seen as the client being able to receive from their inner Good Object often enough to have a more stable peaceful life.

Numerous research studies have found that most all models of psychotherapy are equally helpful, the difference mainly being the quality of the individual therapist, not the theory the therapist subscribes to. Object Relations Theory attempts to explain this phenomenon via the theory of the Good Object. If a therapist can be patient and empathic, most clients improve their functioning in their world. The client carries with them a picture of the empathic therapist that helps them cope with the stressors of daily life, regardless of what theory of psychology they subscribe to.

Continuing developments in the theory
Attachment theory, researched by John Bowlby and others, has continued to deepen our understanding of early object relationships. While a different strain of psychoanalytic theory and research, the findings in attachment studies have continued to support the validity of the developmental progressions described in object relations. Recent decades in developmental psychological research, for example on the onset of a "theory of mind" in children, has suggested that the formation of the mental world is enabled by the infant-parent interpersonal interaction which was the main thesis of British object-relations tradition (e.g. Fairbairn, 1952).

While object relations theory grew out of psychoanalysis, it has been applied to the general fields of psychiatry and psychotherapy by such authors as N. Gregory Hamilton and Glen O. Gabbard. In making object relations theory more useful as a general psychology N. Gregory Hamilton added the specific ego functions to Otto F. Kernberg's concept of object relations units.

See also

Individuals:

Notes and references

Further reading
Fairbairn, W. R. D. (1952). An Object-Relations Theory of the Personality. New York: Basic Books.
Gomez, L. (1997). An Introduction to Object Relations Theory. London: Free Association Press. 
 Masterson, James F. (1988). The Search for the Real Self. 
Mitchell, S.A., & Black, M.J. (1995). Freud and beyond: A history of modern psycho analytic thought. Basic Books, New York.

External links
Object Relations Theory, Psychology Department, Sonoma State University
Melanie Klein Obituary

 
Freudian psychology
Neopsychoanalytic schools
Psychological theories